Lucien Lièvre (Paris, 1878-1936) was a French painter. He competed for and won the Grand Prix de Madagascar and Prix de l'Indochine, with residencies and bursaries in both countries. He was appointed a Chevalier of the Légion d'honneur.

References

External links
 Lucien Lièvre

19th-century French painters
French male painters
20th-century French painters
20th-century French male artists
1878 births
1936 deaths
Chevaliers of the Légion d'honneur
19th-century French male artists